Amarula is a cream liqueur from South Africa.  It is made with sugar, cream and the fruit of the African marula tree (Sclerocarya birrea) which is also locally called the elephant tree or the marriage tree.  It has an alcohol content of 17% by volume (34 proof).  It has had some success at international spirit ratings competitions, winning a gold medal at the 2009 San Francisco World Spirits Competition. It has the taste of slightly fruity caramel.

History
Amarula was first marketed by Southern Liqueur Company of South Africa (the current trademark owners and wholly owned subsidiary of Distell Group Limited) as a liqueur in September 1989, the Amarula spirit having been launched in 1983.

Flavors
 Amarula Cream Liqueur 17% ABV
 Amarula Ethiopian Coffee Cream Liqueur 15.5% ABV
 Raspberry, Chocolate & African Baobab Cream Liqueur 15.5% ABV (launched in 2019)
 Amarula Vanilla Spice Cream Liqueur 15.5% ABV
 Amarula Vegan Liqueur 15.5% ABV
 Khanyisa Limited Edition  15.5% ABV - Proceeds go towards rehabilitating Khanyisa, an orphaned albino baby elephant cruelly injured in a poacher’s snare.

Elephant-associated marketing
African bush elephants enjoy eating the fruit of the marula tree. Because of the marula tree's association with elephants, the distiller has made them its symbol and supports elephant conservation efforts, co-funding the Amarula Elephant Research Programme at the University of Natal, Durban. For marketing efforts, it produces elephant-themed collectible items.

The brand supports elephant research to protect elephants and conserve the population. In 2002, the Amarula Elephant Research Program (AERP) was launched under the direction of Rob Slotow, a professor at the University of KwaZulu-Natal in Durban, South Africa. This primarily researches the way of life, the range of movement and the behavior of the African elephant with the aim of protecting the habitat of the elephants and securing their future in the wild.

Awards
 Amarula Raspberry, Chocolate & African Baobab Cream Liqueur (Master -  Liqueur Masters 2022)
 Amarula Cream Liqueur (2022 Best South African Cream - World Liqueur Awards)
 Amarula Ethiopian Coffee Cream Liqueur (Bronze Winner 2022 Best South African Cream - World Liqueur Awards)
 Amarula Vanilla Spice Cream Liqueur (Bronze Winner 2022 Best South African Cream - World Liqueur Awards)
 Amarula Vegan Liqueur (Silver Winner 2022 Best South African Cream - World Liqueur Awards)

Distribution
Outside of South Africa, Amarula has had particular success in Brazil.

See also
 Springbokkie

References

External links 
  (age-restricted access)
Amarula Trust (age restricted access)
Gourmet Review of Amarula Liqueur in the West Coast Midnight Run art book 2013 edition

Cream liqueurs
Fruit liqueurs
South African brands
South African cuisine
South African alcoholic drinks